Tonight at the London Palladium is a British television variety show that is hosted from the London Palladium theatre in the West End. Originally produced by ATV for the ITV network from 1955 to 1969, it went by its original name Sunday Night at the London Palladium from 25 September 1955 until the name was changed to The London Palladium Show from 1966 to 2 February 1969.

It underwent three revivals, first from 28 October 1973 to 28 October 1974 where it retained its Sunday Night at the London Palladium title, second in 2000 under the title Tonight at the London Palladium, and third from 2014 until 2015 under the title Sunday Night at the Palladium, dropping London. From 2016, the show is called Tonight at the London Palladium and is presented by Bradley Walsh.

A one-off Sunday Night at the London Palladium was screened to mark Bruce Forsyth's 70th birthday in February 1998.

History 
The regular hosts of the show were Tommy Trinder (1955–1958), Bruce Forsyth (1958–1960 and 1961–1964), Don Arrol (1960–1961), Norman Vaughan (1962–1965, 1974), Jimmy Tarbuck (1965–1967), Jim Dale (1973–1974) and Ted Rogers (1974). Other guest comperes were: Hughie Green, Alfred Marks, Robert Morley, Arthur Haynes, Dickie Henderson, Dave Allen, Des O'Connor, Bob Monkhouse and Roger Moore.

The first ever show was compered by Tommy Trinder with Gracie Fields and Guy Mitchell being the night's big guests. The programme was one of ITV's most watched, reaching its biggest audience in January 1960 while Bruce Forsyth was the host, in an edition featuring Cliff Richard and the Shadows, watched by more than 20 million people.

However, according to the book Television's Greatest Hits written and researched by Paul Gambaccini and Rod Taylor the biggest viewing audience was 9.7 million in 1964 (although this would have been homes, rather than viewers, as this was the way British television viewing figures were recorded at the time). This was on Sunday 19 April when Bruce Forsyth introduced the Bachelors, Hope and Keen and Frank Ifield with the Pamela Devis Dancers.

After the Tiller Girls and the lesser acts in the first part was a game show imported from America, Beat the Clock, the format of which was rather like Bruce Forsyth's later hit in The Generation Game. It featured couples having to perform a trick or stunt, like even changing clothes (previously put on, on top of their ordinary clothes) with each other within a set time. If a couple could complete both stunts, the wife must rearrange words stuck to a magnetic board and people had to "arrange them into a well known phrase or saying" in 30 seconds. If she succeeded, the couple won a major prize. Whenever a bell rang, the couple who played at that time would play a jackpot stunt for a cash bonus worth £100 for each week since the last jackpot win.

The second part of the show was where the big stars shone. It featured many top people over the years including Bill Haley rocking around the clock, Chubby Checker who introduced the "new dance" the Twist to the country with a whole stage full of people dancing the Twist and Sammy Davis, Jr. met the Tiller Girls in 1961. Other star guests included: Judy Garland, Bob Hope, Johnnie Ray, Liberace, Petula Clark, the Seekers, the Beatles and the Rolling Stones. Italian mouse puppet Topo Gigio came back a number of times.

The Beatles' publicist Tony Barrow said that after the band's first appearance on the show on 13 October 1963, Beatlemania took off in the UK.

The show always ended using the huge revolving stage where the Tiller Girls, the compere and that night's guests stood on it as it slowly turned around to the familiar end tune of the show.

A famous episode took place in 1961 during a strike by the British acting union Equity, who refused to allow its performers to appear that week. Exempt from this, Bruce Forsyth and comedian Norman Wisdom performed the entire show themselves.

In 1967, the head of ATV, Lew Grade, axed the show. The reasons for this remain obscure, but Grade later said that axing the series was a mistake.

Revivals

First revival (1973–1974) 

This revival was hosted by Jim Dale and Ted Rogers, with each episode being broadcast live. Two episodes were cancelled mid-broadcast due, apparently to a reported bomb scare.  One of these, hosted by Jim Dale, was broadcast for the first time on Talking Pictures UK on Sunday 3 May 2020.  At the end a caption stated that this episode was never broadcast and was missing most of the graphics due to a bomb scare with cuts from previous shows being used to fill in the time.

Second revival (1998) 
A one-off edition of Sunday Night at the London Palladium was broadcast on 15 March 1998, to celebrate Bruce Forsyth's 70th birthday. It included appearances by Diana Ross and Joe Longthorne.

Third revival (2000) 
The format of Sunday Night at the London Palladium was revived in 2000 as Tonight at the London Palladium and was fronted by Bruce Forsyth. It was pre-recorded and aired on Friday evenings. The series was not a ratings success.

Fourth revival (2010) 
On 29 August 2010, Gareth Parnell's Sunday Night at the London Palladium was performed by the staff of the theatre as a one-off commemorative show for the centenary of the Palladium.

Fifth revival (2014–2017) 

A further revival in 2014, called Sunday Night at the Palladium began airing on ITV from 14 September 2014. The series aired for six episodes. On 19 October 2014, it was announced that the show had been recommissioned for a second revived series. This series began airing on 3 May 2015 for five episodes. Presenters of the revived series have included Bradley Walsh, Jimmy Carr and Alexander Armstrong.

From the third series onwards, it was renamed as Tonight at the London Palladium. The third series began airing on 13 April 2016. Episodes aired on Wednesday evenings and were presented by Bradley Walsh. Comedian Joe Pasquale featured in the series. Peter Andre also appeared in all episodes during the series. This series featured two old lady puppet characters called Alice and Audrey who worked at the venue's kiosk, which were designed and built by Puppets Magic Studio for ITV. Following the ratings success of the series, Tonight at the London Palladium returned for a fourth series on 19 April 2017: the puppets were in the Royal Box and called Ruby and Pearl.

Transmissions

Episodes

2014

2015

2016

2017

Archive status 
Very few episodes survive of the earliest versions of this series, including the 1973–1974 revival, though surviving episodes of Sunday Night at the London Palladium are being repeated by Talking Pictures TV as of 2021. (For a general overview of the potential reasons for this, see Wiping.)

References 

1950s British television series
1960s British television series
1970s British television series
2000s British television series
1955 British television series debuts
2017 British television series endings
English-language television shows
Television shows produced by Associated Television (ATV)
London Weekend Television shows
Television series by ITV Studios
British television series revived after cancellation